Asytesta is a genus of beetles belonging to the family Curculionidae.

Species
Species within this genus include:

 Asytesta antica
 Asytesta arachnopus
 Asytesta aucta
 Asytesta bivirgata
 Asytesta brevipennis
 Asytesta circulifera
 Asytesta definita
 Asytesta doriae
 Asytesta dorsalis
 Asytesta dubia
 Asytesta eudyasmoides
 Asytesta gestroi
 Asytesta granulifera
 Asytesta humeralis
 Asytesta lugubris
 Asytesta maura
 Asytesta philippinica
 Asytesta propinqua
 Asytesta rata
 Asytesta sejuncta
 Asytesta setipes
 Asytesta signata
 Asytesta trivittata
 Asytesta verecunda
 Asytesta versuta
 Asytesta vittata
 Asytesta ypsilon

References 

Cryptorhynchinae
Curculionidae genera